Hu, in ancient Egypt, was the deification of the first word, the word of creation, that Atum was said to have exclaimed upon ejaculating or, alternatively, his circumcision, in his masturbatory act of creating the Ennead.

Hu is mentioned already in the Old Kingdom Pyramid texts (PT 251, PT 697) as companion of the deceased pharaoh. Together with Sia, he was depicted in the retinue of Thoth, with whom he was also occasionally identified.

In the Middle Kingdom, all gods participated in Hu and Sia, and were associated with Ptah who created the universe by uttering the word of creation. Hu was depicted in human shape, as a falcon, or as a man with a ram's head.

In the New Kingdom, both Hu and Sia together with Heka, Irer and Sedjem were members of the fourteen creative powers of Amun-Ra. By the time of Ptolemaic Egypt, Hu had merged with Shu (air).

References
 Wilkinson, R. H., Die Welt der Götter im Alten Ägypten. Glaube - Macht - Mythologie , Stuttgart 2003

External links
 http://www.touregypt.net/featurestories/hu.htm

Egyptian gods
Language and mysticism
Masturbation
Creation myths
Ptah
Falcon deities

ca:Llista de personatges de la mitologia egípcia#H